Asura tripuncta is a moth of the family Erebidae. It is found in India.

References

tripuncta
Moths described in 1935
Moths of Asia